Charlie McWade (born January 2, 1974 in Queens, New York) is an American television and film actor. He is perhaps best known for his role in the television series Third Watch as NYPD Officer Steve Gusler.

Filmography

References

External links
 

1974 births
Living people
American male film actors
People from Queens, New York
Male actors from New York City